Paradox is a 2009 British science fiction police drama, starring Tamzin Outhwaite as Detective Inspector Rebecca Flint. Written by Lizzie Mickery and produced by Clerkenwell Films for the BBC, it was filmed and set in Manchester, England.

Flint heads a police team played by Mark Bonnar and Chiké Okonkwo, working with a scientist played by Emun Elliott, as they attempt to prevent disasters foretold by images being sent from the future.

The series aired on BBC One and BBC HD during November and December 2009. It received mostly negative reviews from critics, and it was not renewed for a second season.

Synopsis
Detective Inspector Rebecca Flint (Tamzin Outhwaite), Detective Sergeant Ben Holt (Mark Bonnar) and Detective Constable Callum Gada (Chiké Okonkwo) investigate images being broadcast to an eminent astrophysicist Dr Christian King's (Emun Elliott) laboratory, which appear to show catastrophic events in the future.

Production
Murray Ferguson, chief executive of Clerkenwell Films, said that they were looking for something "different from the traditional formula of investigating a crime that has already taken place" and premise for the series, the police having knowledge of future incidents, was developed. Lizzie Mickery (The 39 Steps, The State Within) was chosen to write the series. She said she has "always been interested in the decisions you're not aware you are making". The series was based on the "moral and emotional implications of having the ability to change the future". The series was then commissioned by Ben Stephenson and Jay Hunt for BBC One with executive producers Patrick Spence, for BBC Northern Ireland, and Ferguson. The series was produced by Marcus Wilson and directed by Simon Cellan Jones and Omar Madha. Filming began in Greater Manchester, England in June 2009, with the majority of filming in the Northern Quarter district of the City of Manchester. The Imperial War Museum North is used as the backdrop for Dr King's place of employment, Prometheus Labs.

Filming was completed over 13 weeks and Fergison said: "Each episode is set within a very short time period so the changeable weather caused havoc."

Cancellation
On 25 February 2010, David Bentley of the Coventry Telegraph writing in their Geek Files blog, quoted an unnamed BBC spokesman: "In spite of a great cast and production team, Paradox did not find its audience in the way that we had hoped".

Episodes

Reception
The series peaked at 4.81 million viewers for the first episode.

In The Daily Telegraph, James Walton said that despite the "exciting" climactic scenes, "[s]adly, by then the show's complete absence of internal logic (or, if you prefer, its overwhelming silliness) meant that it was beyond help." Comparing with American series FlashForward and ITV1's Collision, Alex Hardy from The Times said that the former "is currently doing a much better job at such space-time contemplation" and that the "'working back from an accident' format unfolded much more deliciously" in the latter. Following the second episode, The Times' Andrew Billen said that although the last 10 minutes were exciting, "[t]he difficulty lay in the 50 minutes of scratchy dialogue, robotic acting and general misery that it took to get there." Jeremy Clay from the Leicester Mercury also liked the climax but said "the rest was utterly daft", the programme tried the patience of The Observer's Phil Hogan and Tom Sutcliffe from The Independent said that "the Prometheus Innovation Satellite Downlink offers a perfect acronym for the state you'd have to be in to take this kind of thing seriously".

References

External links
 
 

BBC television dramas
British science fiction television shows
British crime television series
2009 British television series debuts
2000s British science fiction television series
2009 British television series endings
English-language television shows
2000s British crime television series
Television series by Clerkenwell Films